Camping 2 is a 2010 French comedy film directed by Fabien Onteniente. It is the sequel to the 2006 film Camping. The third installment of the film series, Camping 3, was released in 2016.

Plot 
Upset that his fiancee wants to take a break in their relationship, and to reduce his stress levels, Jean-Pierre Savelli, an insurance company employee in Clermont-Ferrand, decides to spend his holiday in an unusual place for him - the Blue Waves campsite, near Arcachon. There he meets eager campers including Patrick Chirac, and begins to act as a single man again. At first put off by Patrick's overtures of friendship, the two become best friends, as Jean-Pierre begins to "loosen up" a bit. Taking a lead from Patrick, Jean-Pierre gradually acquires the same outlook on life and even becomes the new darling of Blue Waves, which makes Patrick jealous. Patrick begins to cause discord in the camp, although the other campers (Jacky, Paulo, Laurette and Sophie) are already ill-humored, all the more so when it is revealed that the "Blue Waves" campsite may be sold to a Spanish group, to be replaced by a luxury hotel.

When Mrs Chatel reveals the proposal to the campers, everyone forgets their quarrels and rallies around, united against the project. To this end, the campers invent a ploy to undo the work: they decide to try to convince the DRAC inspector that Gallo-Roman pottery is buried in the ground, and that the site is of archaeological importance. On the day of the inspection, Jean-Pierre claims to be the inspector during the mayor's visit. The real expert, meanwhile, is "hijacked" by Patrick and led through the neighboring nudist camp. The deception ends up being uncovered, the inspector visits the correct campsite, examines the excavated pottery and authenticates it as genuine. The archaeological site is proven, and so the redevelopment work will not take place.

The time comes for Patrick to leave and, having managed to seduce the lovely Pauline, they set out together for his home in Dijon. But she catches him looking at another girl at the tollbooth. She then leaves the car and Patrick returns home alone. As for Jean-Pierre, he reconciles with his fiancée and, with his daughter Lisa, the three leave for home.

Cast 

 Franck Dubosc as Patrick Chirac
 Richard Anconina as Jean-Pierre Savelli
 Mathilde Seigner as Sophie Gatineau
 Antoine Duléry as Paul Gatineau
 Claude Brasseur as Jacky Pic
 Mylène Demongeot as Laurette Pic
 Christine Citti as Madame Chatel
 Alysson Paradis as Sandra
 Vincent Moscato as Mario
 Julie de Bona as Pauline
 Lucia Sanchez as Madame Gandarias
 Laurent Olmedo as The 37
 Abbes Zahmani as Mendez
 Marco Bonini as Shamalack
 Enna Balland as Liza
 Charlie Barde as Aurélie Gatineau
 Benoît Simonpietri as Sébastien Gatineau
 Paco Cabezas as Lopez Carril
 Éric Naggar as The mayor
 Jean-Claude Bolle-Reddat as Couécou
 Peyo Lizarazu as Julien
 Marilyne Canto as Valérie
 Nicolas Gob as The policeman

References

External links
 

2010 films
2010 comedy films
French comedy films
Films about families
Pathé films
Films directed by Fabien Onteniente
2010s French films